Clivina jeanneli is a species of ground beetle in the subfamily Scaritinae. It was described by Kult in 1959.

References

jeanneli
Beetles described in 1959